The Austrian Fencing Federation (ÖFV) is the national organisation for fencing in Austria and as such is a member of the international governing body for amateur fencing, the Fédération Internationale d'Escrime. It is based in Graz.

The Austrian Fencing Federation was founded in 1929, with Richard Brunner as its first president, although there had been earlier Austrian fencing bodies, beginning in 1887 with a German-Austrian Fencing Federation founded in Mannheim. It was dissolved in 1938 as a result of the annexation of Austria by Nazi Germany, and refounded on 26 April 1946. , it had 52 constituent organisations with a total of 1,430 members. There are also two general secretaries.

Since 2008, the president of the federation has been Markus Mareich.

Presidents
 1945–1946: Friedrich Golling
 1947–1949: Franz Chrudimak
 1949–1952: Karl Hanisch
 1952–1971: Hermann Resch
 1971–1987: Peter Ulrich-Pur
 1987–1989: Peter Berger
 1989–1994: Rainer Mauritz
 1994–2000: Klaus Vorreither
 2000–2002: Roland Kayser
 2002–2008: Josef Poscharnig
 2008–2015: Markus Mareich
 since 2016:  Ritwik Rastogi

Notable Austrian fencers 

 Albert Bogen (Albert Bógathy), saber, Olympic silver
 Siegfried Flesch (1872–1939), saber, Olympic bronze
 Dr. Otto Herschmann, saber, Olympic silver
 Heinz Lechner (born 1928)
 Ellen Preis (1912–2007), foil, Olympic champion, 3x world champion, 17x Austrian champion

References

External links 
 

Fencing organizations
National federations of the European Fencing Confederation
Sports organizations established in 1929
Fencing
Fencing in Austria
1929 establishments in Austria